Polar Star was a Russian language literary almanac, published in Saint Petersburg from 1822 to 1825. The full title in Russian was Полярная звезда. Карманная книжка для любительниц и любителей русской словесности (Polar star. A pocket book for lovers of Russian literature).  The main editors were Alexander Bestuzhev and Kondraty Ryleyev.

References

1822 establishments in the Russian Empire
Annual magazines
Defunct literary magazines published in Europe
Defunct magazines published in Russia
Magazines established in 1822
Magazines disestablished in 1825
Magazines published in Saint Petersburg
Russian-language magazines
Literary magazines published in Russia